The J-Bay Open 2017 was an event of the Association of Surfing Professionals for 2017 World Surf League.

This event was held from 12 to 23 July at Jeffreys Bay, (Eastern Cape, South Africa), it was opposed by 36 surfers. The finalist was Filipe Toledo of Brazil.

Round 1

Round 2

Round 3

Round 4

Round 5

Quarter finals

Semi finals

Final

Prizes and placing

References

J-Bay Open
2017 World Surf League